Hayne van Ghizeghem ( 1445 – 1476 to 1497) was a Franco-Flemish composer of the early Renaissance Burgundian School.

While many of his works have survived, little is known about his life. He was probably born in Gijzegem (near Aalst, in modern Belgium).
His musical talent must have been noticed early by Charles, Count of Charolais (later to become Charles the Bold) because there is a record of his being personally assigned to a teacher by him; in 1467 he is shown in the Burgundian employment records as being a singer. In addition, he was named along with Adrien Basin and Antoine Busnois as "chantre et valet de chambre" to Charles, indicating the special regard in which he was held.

In addition to serving as a singer and composer, he evidently served as a soldier as well, for there is a record of purchase of military equipment for him, prior to the campaign against Liège by Charles. Charles took his musicians along with him on his campaigns, because he loved music as much as war, and insisted on entertainment; however Hayne was the only one of his famous musicians known to be also outfitted as a soldier. He is known to have been at the Siege of Beauvais in 1472, where Charles was decisively repulsed by the French, and Hayne was long presumed by scholars to have been killed in that battle. However, recent research into his surviving compositions indicates that some may have been produced after 1472, especially because they seem to show stylistic development beyond the ones that can be definitively dated to 1472 or before. Current scholarship suggests he may have survived the siege, and gone to work at the court of France. That such a distinguished singer and composer worked for France's bitter rival would have been an offense easy to forgive, for Burgundian musicians of the time were highly prized.

Hayne is principally known as a composer of chansons, and most of these are rondeaux. Two in particular—Allez regrets, and De tous biens plaine—were so famous in late 15th-century Europe that they appeared in 25 separate sources, many dating from before the invention of printing, and they were used as source material for many later compositions by other composers. Almost all of his works are for three voices; they are simple and clear in texture, in the typical manner of the Burgundian school; and the melodic voice is the highest.

Eleven pieces can be definitively attributed to Hayne, though numerous similar works classified as "anonymous" may actually be compositions of his. The entire collection has been edited and published in Corpus mensurabilis musicae, vol. lxxiv (1977), by B. Hudson.

Notes

References and further reading

 Louise Litterick:  "Hayne van Ghizeghem", in The New Grove Dictionary of Music and Musicians, ed. Stanley Sadie.  20 vol.  London, Macmillan Publishers Ltd., 1980.  
  
 Gustave Reese, Music in the Renaissance. New York, W.W. Norton & Co., 1954. 
 Clemens Goldberg: "Was zitiert Compere; Zitat, Topos, Zitat und Paraphrase in den Regrets-Chansons von Hayne van Ghizeghem und Loyset Compère, Bärenreiter 1996, p. 88-99. Download

External links
 
 Edition of his chansons at Goldberg Stiftung

1440s births
15th-century deaths
Belgian classical composers
Belgian male classical composers
Burgundian school composers
Flemish composers
15th-century Franco-Flemish composers
People from Aalst, Belgium
Renaissance composers